Glenfern Sanctuary Regional Park is a regional park situated near Port Fitzroy on Great Barrier Island in New Zealand's Hauraki Gulf.

References 

Great Barrier Island
Parks in the Auckland Region
Regional parks of New Zealand
Tourist attractions in the Auckland Region